T.P.E. Featuring Adam Marano is the debut album of the dance-pop and freestyle project T.P.E. created by music producer Adam Marano. The album was released in 1992 by Micmac Records. Of the four singles released from the album, the only one to succeed was "Then Came You", which reached No. 91 on the Billboard Hot 100 in 1991. Other singles of this album were "Forever and a Day", released in 1992, "Sex U Down", released in 1993 and "Dance with Me", released in 1994. The album also contains the participation of freestyle singers that were already popular locally in Philadelphia such as Denine and Jade Starling, a member of the group Pretty Poison.

Track listing

Charts
Singles

References

1992 debut albums
T.P.E. albums